Lydia Mary Bedford is an English professional football manager who is an assistant coach of FA Women's Super League team Arsenal.

Career
Bedford began her coaching career in 2008 and earned her UEFA Pro Licence in 2019.

On 30 November 2021, Leicester City announced the appointment of Bedford as the first team manager of Leicester City Women on a contract to the end of the 2021–22 season. She officially started her role as first team manager on 6 December. She led Leicester to their first top-flight win in her second match in charge, winning 2–0 over Birmingham City at home.

After successfully keeping the team in the top division in 2021–22 season, she signed a new two-year deal with Leicester City Women on 5 July 2022. On 3 November 2022, she was replaced as manager by Willie Kirk.

On 24 February 2023, Arsenal confirmed that Bedford had joined the club as an assistant coach.

Honours
Individual

 FA Women's Super League Manager of the Month: February 2022

References

Year of birth missing (living people)
Living people
English women's football managers
Women's Super League managers
Leicester City W.F.C. managers
Arsenal F.C. non-playing staff